Lanarkshire was a Scottish  county constituency of the House of Commons of the Parliament of the United Kingdom (Westminster) from 1708 to 1868. It elected one Member of Parliament (MP) by the first past the post voting system.

Creation
The British parliamentary constituency was created in 1708 following the Acts of Union, 1707 and replaced the former Parliament of Scotland shire constituency of Lanarkshire.

Boundaries
The  constituency covered the whole of the Scottish county of  Lanarkshire, apart from the Lanark Burghs.

History
The constituency elected one Member of Parliament (MP) by the first past the post system until it was abolished for the 1868 general election.

In 1868 the constituency was replaced by the new constituencies of North Lanarkshire and South Lanarkshire.

Members of Parliament

Election results

Elections in the 1830s

Elections in the 1840s

Elections in the 1850s

Lockhart's death caused a by-election.

Elections in the 1860s

References 

Politics of Lanarkshire
Historic parliamentary constituencies in Scotland (Westminster)
Constituencies of the Parliament of the United Kingdom established in 1708
Constituencies of the Parliament of the United Kingdom disestablished in 1868